Else Marie Jakobsen (28 February 1927 – 12 December 2012) was a Norwegian designer and textile artist.

Biography
Jakobsen was born and raised in Kristiansand, Norway.  She graduated from Norwegian National Academy of Craft and Art Industry (now Oslo National Academy of the Arts) in 1951. She also studied at a Gobelin tapestry workshop at  Uitgeverij In de Knipscheer in the Netherlands during 1950. She was from 1951, both a designer and an artist in the textile industries,  At the same time she began to make tapestries. Her debut exhibition was held at the Artists' Association (Kunstnerforbundet) at Oslo in 1966. In addition, she was active as a speaker across Norway and in other countries as well.

As a textile artist, she  won the decoration competition for the University of Bergen science building (90 square meters) as well as the Erkebispegården, Trondheim (30 square meters) and Kristiansand District Court. Else Marie Jakobsen is particularly known for her work on altarpieces. She  made 33 altarpieces at home and abroad, including in Copenhagen, Spain and the UAE. She also wove  over 500 tapestries for private homes and public buildings.

Jakobsen  participated in exhibitions including at Riga, Vilnius, Münster, Copenhagen, Orléans and in Slovakia plus changing exhibits in United States and Denmark. She  also participated in the  Lausanne International Tapestry Biennials.

For her arts, she  won several prices and  an honorary degree at the MF Norwegian School of Theology. She was also  made a Knight, First Class of the Order of St. Olav. Else Marie Jakobsen lived most of her life in Kristiansand where she also held political offices. Prior to her death in 2012, she donated a number of her works to the Vest-Agder Museum Kristiansand.

References

Related reading 
Joseph Jobe (ed) Le Grand Livre de la Tapisserie  (Lausanne, Switzerland: Edita, 1965) 
Randi Nygaard Lium: Ny norsk billedvev  (C. Huitfeldt. 1992)   
Knut Berg (ed) Norsk kunsthistorie (Oslo: Gyldendal, 1981–83)   
Gunvald Opstad: Else Marie Jakobsen, biography, 128 pages,  (J. M. Stenersens Forlag. 1987) 
Gunvald Opstad: Else Marie Jakobsen, catalogue, 88 pages,  2003

External links
Else Marie Jakobsen, Æresdoktorforedrag Agder Vitenskapsakademi Årbok 2009 
The Lausanne International Tapestry Biennials (1962-1995)

1927 births
2012 deaths
People from Kristiansand
Oslo National Academy of the Arts alumni
Norwegian tapestry artists
Norwegian designers
Norwegian textile designers
Norwegian artists
Women textile artists
Politicians from Kristiansand
Recipients of the St. Olav's Medal